Maureen G. Mulvaney, also known as MGM, (born 1950 in Portsmouth, Virginia) is a former American special education teacher and college psychology instructor.  Mulvaney is currently an internationally known Certified Speaking Professional (National Speakers Association –CSP earned designation), published author and co-author of 4 books, Amazon best selling author of The Women's Millionaire Club, and entrepreneur and CEO and owner of MGM & Associates, Inc. Mulvaney wanted a simple Success Recipe that anyone could use to create success in their life, whether they were rich or poor or skilled or unskilled.  In her book, The Women's Millionaire Club she defines her Secret Success Recipe.

Biography
Maureen Mulvaney is one of three children born, in 1950, to Marie and Paul Mulvaney, a US Naval Officer.  The Mulvaneys named their oldest daughter, Maureen G. Mulvaney, as it was both lyrical and Irish but mostly so the initials would be MGM—their Big Production.

Marie Mulvaney was the ‘Queen of Spaced Repetition’.  Maxwell Maltz's  was noted for coining the term ‘Spaced Repetition’.  By repeating the same phrases, either positive or negative, six times a day, for 21 days, one would create a positive or negative habit. Marie, unknowingly, used Maltz's techniques to reinforce positive statements with Maureen by repeatedly telling her, “You are funny. You are MGM--a big production.  One day, you'll be on stage speaking before thousands of people.”

Marie's practices of repeating statements to her daughter succeeded. Maureen, unconsciously, started taking interest in speaking. First, she became a special educator/ elementary teacher.  Then she progressed to teaching college psychology. Finally, she used the speaking skills she had learned through teaching and combined them with the skills she had learned from her beloved sorority experiences  to live up to Marie's expectation by becoming an internationally known speaker.  Organically, people stopped calling her Maureen and began to call her—MGM, a big production.

Education
Mulvaney earned a B.S. dual major in Special Education and Elementary Education from Troy State University, in Troy, Alabama.  She earned an Ed.M. from Boston University, overseas program, in counseling psychology. Mulvaney is a sister of Alpha Delta Pi Sorority, the first secret society for college women in the world. She earned a Certified Speaking Professional (CSP) designation from the National Speakers Association.

The Women's Millionaire Club
Mulvaney authored The Women's Millionaire Club. Eve Gumpel wrote:

Mulvaney wanted to know how the successful women entrepreneurs became both personally and financially successful. "For her research and book, Mulvaney surveyed, assessed and interviewed twenty-one top performing women millionaires from various home-based businesses. What she found was a winning combination of traits and behaviors or 'ingredients' that created Recipes for Million Dollar Success", wrote Susan Pascal.

Mulvaney took all the recipes for success that she learned from successful women, including her grandmother, mother, women biographies, and interviewed millionaires, and complied them into her book, The Women's Millionaire Club. The book provides insights into women running a home-based business.

Other books 
As author
 Mulvaney, Maureen Gail. Any Kid Can Be a Super Star ~Practical Parenting Strategies for Real Parents.MGM & Associates, INC Publisher. 1999
 Mulvaney, Maureen Gail. '''The Women's Millionaire Club~The Closely Guarded SECRET SUCCESS RECIPES of Millionaire Women for Building and Owning a Millionaire Dollar Home-Based Business Gratitude Publishing, LLC.  2009.Amazon Best Seller (17 March 2009)

As co-author 
 Canfield, Jack & Hansen, Mark Victor. Chicken Soup for the Teacher's Soul. Health Communications, Inc Publisher. 2002.
#1 New York Times Bestseller Story (Page 10) Any Kid Can Be a Super Star by Maureen G. Mulvaney (MGM)
 Mission Possible~ Volume Eight. Insight Publishing Company, 2004.

References

External links
 National Speakers Association 
 Certified Speaking Professional
  Maureen G. Mulvaney's Official Site -MGM & Associates, INC (http://www.mgmsuperstar.com)
  Maureen G. Mulvaney's Speaker Wiki Site  (http://speakerwiki.org/speakers/Maureen_G_Muvlaney )

Living people
1950 births
Boston University School of Education alumni
American self-help writers
American women chief executives
Troy University alumni